is one of the eight wards of the city of Hiroshima, Japan.

As of November 1, 2005, the ward has an estimated population of 76,858 and a density of 817.55 persons per km2. The total area is 94.01 km2.

References

Wards of Hiroshima